Anil Rathod (12 March 1950 – 5 August 2020) was an Indian politician from Ahmednagar district, Maharashtra. From 1990 to 2014, he was a member of the Maharashtra Legislative Assembly from Ahmednagar City Vidhan Sabha constituency as a member of Shiv Sena. He died from a heart attack on 5 August 2020.

Positions held
 1990: Elected to Maharashtra Legislative Assembly (1st term) 
 1995: Re-elected to Maharashtra Legislative Assembly (2nd term)
 1999: Re-elected to Maharashtra Legislative Assembly (3rd term)
 2004: Re-elected to Maharashtra Legislative Assembly (4th term)
 2009: Re-elected to Maharashtra Legislative Assembly (5th term)
 2009–2020: Deputy Leader, Shiv Sena

References

External links
 Shiv Sena Home Page

1950 births
2020 deaths
Maharashtra MLAs 1990–1995
Maharashtra MLAs 1995–1999
Maharashtra MLAs 1999–2004
Maharashtra MLAs 2004–2009
Maharashtra MLAs 2009–2014
Marathi politicians
People from Ahmednagar
Place of birth missing
Shiv Sena politicians